Mark Edison Saccomanno (born April 30, 1980) is an American former professional baseball first baseman. At 17, Saccomanno was awarded the Klein Forest High School Golden Glove award. He was also selected to the 17-and-under AAU National All-Tournament Team. At 18, was named Second-Team All-District 16-5A as a shortstop and received the National Scholar Athlete Award. He played college baseball for Baylor University. He was selected in the 23rd round of the 2003 Major League Baseball draft by the Astros.

Saccomanno was called up to the majors by the Houston Astros on September 8, and hit a home run on the first pitch of his first major league at-bat, pinch hit for pitcher Alberto Árias, against Pirates' pitcher Ian Snell. A free agent at the end of the season, he re-signed with the Astros on January 5,  to a minor league deal with an invitation to Spring training as a non-roster player.

See also
Home run in first Major League at-bat

References

External links

1980 births
Living people
American people of Italian descent
Baseball players from Houston
Baylor Bears baseball players
Cañeros de Los Mochis players
Corpus Christi Hooks players
Houston Astros players
Jacksonville Suns players
Major League Baseball first basemen
Martinsville Astros players
Navegantes del Magallanes players
American expatriate baseball players in Venezuela
New Orleans Zephyrs players
Round Rock Express players
Salem Avalanche players
2006 World Baseball Classic players
Anchorage Glacier Pilots players